Dennis Griffiths (12 August 1935 – 13 August 2005) was a Welsh professional footballer, who played as a right-half. He made appearances in the English Football League for Wrexham in the 1950s. He also played for Welsh league club Bangor City.

References

1935 births
2005 deaths
People from Ruabon
Sportspeople from Wrexham County Borough
Welsh footballers
Association football defenders
Wrexham A.F.C. players
Bangor City F.C. players
English Football League players